Plasmodium tejerai is a parasite of the genus Plasmodium subgenus Haemamoeba.

Like all Plasmodium species P. tejerai has both vertebrate and insect hosts. The vertebrate hosts for this parasite are birds.

Taxonomy 
The parasite was first described by Gabaldon and Ulloa in 1977.

Distribution 
This parasite is found in Brazil and Venezuela.

Vectors
Not known.

Clinical features and host pathology 
This organism infects the domestic turkey (Meleagris gallopavo) and the South American penguin (Spheniscus magellanicus).

Morphologically this parasite resembles Plasmodium relictum closely. In the penguin infection may be fatal with splenomegaly, hepatomegaly, hydropericardium and pulmonary oedema.

References 

tejerai
Parasites of birds